Tricyphona is a genus of flies in the family Pediciidae.

Species

Subgenus Eucyphona Alexander, 1950
Tricyphona epione (Alexander, 1950)
Subgenus Pentacyphona Alexander, 1968
Tricyphona ampla (Doane, 1900)
Tricyphona aspidoptera (Coquillett, 1905)
Tricyphona autumnalis Alexander, 1917
Tricyphona cinereicolor (Alexander, 1958)
Tricyphona huffae (Alexander, 1940)
Tricyphona smithae (Alexander, 1941)
Tricyphona subaptera (Alexander, 1917)
Tricyphona truncata (Alexander, 1941)
Subgenus Tricyphona Zetterstedt, 1837
Tricyphona acicularis (Alexander, 1945)
Tricyphona aethiops (Alexander, 1955)
Tricyphona ailinia (Alexander, 1965)
Tricyphona albicentra (Alexander, 1962)
Tricyphona alpigena (Strobl, 1910)
Tricyphona alticola Strobl, 1910
Tricyphona aperta Coquillett, 1905
Tricyphona araucana (Alexander, 1971)
Tricyphona arisana Alexander, 1924
Tricyphona arthuriana Alexander, 1924
Tricyphona auripennis (Osten Sacken, 1860)
Tricyphona aysenensis (Alexander, 1944)
Tricyphona bianchii (Alexander, 1966)
Tricyphona bicollis (Alexander, 1967)
Tricyphona bicomata (Alexander, 1943)
Tricyphona bidentifera (Alexander, 1950)
Tricyphona brevifurcata Alexander, 1919
Tricyphona buetigeri (Alexander, 1960)
Tricyphona calcar (Osten Sacken, 1860)
Tricyphona cascadensis (Alexander, 1954)
Tricyphona cervina Alexander, 1917
Tricyphona chilota Alexander, 1929
Tricyphona claggi Alexander, 1931
Tricyphona confluens Alexander, 1922
Tricyphona congrua (Walker, 1848)
Tricyphona constans (Doane, 1900)
Tricyphona contraria Bergroth, 1888
Tricyphona crassipyga Alexander, 1928
Tricyphona degenerata Alexander, 1917
Tricyphona diaphanoides (Alexander, 1938)
Tricyphona disphana (Doane, 1900)
Tricyphona elegans (Brunetti, 1912)
Tricyphona ericarum (Alexander, 1966)
Tricyphona exoloma (Doane, 1900)
Tricyphona fenderiana (Alexander, 1954)
Tricyphona flavipennis (Brunetti, 1918)
Tricyphona formosana Alexander, 1920
Tricyphona frigida Alexander, 1919
Tricyphona fulvicolor (Alexander, 1945)
Tricyphona furcata Alexander, 1926
Tricyphona fuscostigmata (Alexander, 1965)
Tricyphona gigantea (Alexander, 1940)
Tricyphona glabripennis (Brunetti, 1912)
Tricyphona glacialis Alexander, 1917
Tricyphona guttistigma (Alexander, 1941)
Tricyphona hannai Alexander, 1923
Tricyphona hynesiana (Alexander, 1961)
Tricyphona immaculata (Meigen, 1804)
Tricyphona inconstans (Osten Sacken, 1860)
Tricyphona insulana Alexander, 1913
Tricyphona johnsoni Alexander, 1930
Tricyphona katahdin Alexander, 1914
Tricyphona kehama (Alexander, 1969)
Tricyphona kirishimensis Alexander, 1928
Tricyphona livida Madarassy, 1881
Tricyphona longiloba (Alexander, 1938)
Tricyphona macateei Alexander, 1919
Tricyphona macrophallus (Alexander, 1945)
Tricyphona magra (Alexander, 1962)
Tricyphona margipunctata (Alexander, 1953)
Tricyphona megastigma (Alexander, 1967)
Tricyphona nigritarsis (Skuse, 1890)
Tricyphona nigrocuspis (Alexander, 1973)
Tricyphona novaezelandiae Alexander, 1922
Tricyphona omeiana (Alexander, 1938)
Tricyphona optabilis Alexander, 1924
Tricyphona orophila (Alexander, 1928)
Tricyphona pahasapa (Alexander, 1958)
Tricyphona paludicola Alexander, 1916
Tricyphona pectinata Alexander, 1931
Tricyphona penai (Alexander, 1953)
Tricyphona perpallens (Alexander, 1957)
Tricyphona perrecessa (Alexander, 1950)
Tricyphona phaeostigma (Alexander, 1962)
Tricyphona platyptera Alexander, 1929
Tricyphona protea Alexander, 1918
Tricyphona pumila (Alexander, 1943)
Tricyphona rainieria Alexander, 1924
Tricyphona rubiginosa Alexander, 1931
Tricyphona sakkya (Alexander, 1962)
Tricyphona schummeli Edwards, 1921
Tricyphona septentrionalis Bergroth, 1888
Tricyphona serrimarga (Alexander, 1944)
Tricyphona shastensis (Alexander, 1958)
Tricyphona simplicistyla Alexander, 1930
Tricyphona tachulanica (Alexander, 1949)
Tricyphona tacoma (Alexander, 1949)
Tricyphona townesiana (Alexander, 1942)
Tricyphona unicolor (Schummel, 1829)
Tricyphona unigera (Alexander, 1949)
Tricyphona ussurica (Alexander, 1934)
Tricyphona vernalis (Osten Sacken, 1861)
Tricyphona xanthoptera (Alexander, 1966)
Tricyphona yakushimana Alexander, 1930
Tricyphona zwicki Mendl, 1973
Subgenus Trifurcaria Lackschewitz, 1964
Tricyphona arctica (Lackschewitz, 1964)

References

 

Pediciidae
Tipuloidea genera